Center Township is one of ten townships in Gibson County, Indiana. As of the 2010 census, its population was 1,341 and it contained 609 housing units. Francisco is the township seat.

Geography

Cities and towns
 Francisco

Unincorporated towns
 Douglas

Adjacent townships
Gibson County
 Washington Township (north)
 Columbia Township (east)
 Barton Township (southeast)
 Union Township (southwest)
 Patoka Township (west)
Pike County
 Logan Township (northeast)

Cemeteries
The township contains one cemetery, Meade.

Major highways
 Indiana State Road 64

Education
Center Township is served by the East Gibson School Corporation.

Schools
 Francisco Elementary

References
 
 United States Census Bureau cartographic boundary files

External links
 Indiana Township Association
 United Township Association of Indiana

Townships in Gibson County, Indiana
Townships in Indiana